Ayal Njanalla (English: He is not me) is a 2015 Malayalam romantic comedy film written and directed by actor Vineeth Kumar, making his debut based on the story by director Ranjith. The film stars Fahadh Faasil, Mrudula Murali, Divya Pillai and Akshat Singh in prominent roles. The film opened to mixed reviews and average performance at the box office. The film was produced by Sundar Menon, Sun Ads and Film Productions, and was the first production venture from the house.

Plot 
This film revolves around a youth named Prakashan, who moved to Gujarat 15 years ago. He works as an assistant to his uncle who runs a decrepit tire shop at Kutch. Having moved to Gujarat years back, he nurtures a dream of marrying Esha and of paying off his uncle's debts. Hoping to sell off his ancestral property in Kerala, Prakashan heads to Bangalore to meet an old school mate Arun, where he is mistaken for the celebrity Fahadh Faasil (played by himself).

Cast 
 Fahadh Faasil as Prakashan/Fahadh Faasil
 Mrudula Murali as Esha
 Divya Pillai as Heera
 Sijoy Varghese as Manaf
 S. P. Sreekumar as Jomon
 Akshat Singh as Mottu
 Ranji Panicker-Menon
 Tini Tom as Chacko
 Anil Nedumangad as Police Officer  
 Nobi as Sabu
 T G Ravi as chandrammama
 Dinesh Prabhakar as Vasco
 Jins Baskar as Arun 
 Aileena Catherin Amon as Diya
 Sreekanth Menon as Lakhan
 JK Nair-dheerubhai
 Babu Annur-aravindettan

References

External links 
 

2015 films
2010s Malayalam-language films